José Ramón González Romo (born 12 October 1963) is a Spanish retired footballer who played as a midfielder.

Football career
Born in Seville, Romo spent his entire professional career, which lasted 12 years, in his native Andalusia. He started with local giants Real Betis in 1981, remaining eight seasons with the club but being played sparingly during his spell – only in 1985–86 did he appear on a regular basis, scoring seven goals in 25 matches for an eventual eighth-place finish; he was also loaned to Recreativo de Huelva in Segunda División before being released in 1989.

Romo then played two seasons with Cádiz CF, again in La Liga, again without much individual fortune. Before retiring in 1993 at not yet 30, he again represented Huelva, now in Segunda División B, and amassed Spanish top level totals of 103 games and nine goals.

Post-retirement
After retiring, Romo worked as a bus driver in the public transport service company of Seville.

References

External links
 
 Stats at Cadistas1910 
 

1963 births
Living people
People from Seville
Footballers from Seville
Spanish footballers
Association football midfielders
La Liga players
Segunda División players
Segunda División B players
Real Betis players
Recreativo de Huelva players
Cádiz CF players
Spain youth international footballers